César Marcelo Meli (born 20 June 1992) is an Argentine footballer who plays as a defensive midfielder for Aldosivi.

Club career
In 2011, he started playing in Colón until 2014, when he was transferred to Boca Juniors for $750,000 Argentine pesos.

In July 2016, he was loaned to Sporting CP.

Honours
Boca Juniors
Primera División (1): 2015
Copa Argentina (1): 2014–15

References

External links

1992 births
Living people
Footballers from Buenos Aires
Argentine footballers
Argentine expatriate footballers
Association football midfielders
Club Atlético Colón footballers
Boca Juniors footballers
Racing Club de Avellaneda footballers
Primeira Liga players
Sporting CP footballers
Esporte Clube Vitória players
Club Atlético Belgrano footballers
Central Córdoba de Santiago del Estero footballers
Hapoel Be'er Sheva F.C. players
Aldosivi footballers
Argentine Primera División players
Campeonato Brasileiro Série A players
Israeli Premier League players
Expatriate footballers in Portugal
Expatriate footballers in Brazil
Expatriate footballers in Israel
Argentine expatriate sportspeople in Portugal
Argentine expatriate sportspeople in Brazil
Argentine expatriate sportspeople in Israel